Sonda is a family of Brazilian-built sounding rockets which serves as an R&D path to the VLS orbital rocket. Launches started in 1965 and continue to this day. Launch sites include Wallops Island, Andoya, Kiruna, Natal, Alcântara, Cassino and SvalRak.

Sonda I

The Sonda I is a two stage rocket (S10-1 + S-10-2 rocket stages) with a maximum flight altitude of 65 km, a liftoff thrust of 27 kN a total mass of 100 kg, a diameter of 11 cm and a length of 4.5 metres. It was launched 9 times between 1965 and 1966.

Sonda II

The Sonda II is a single stage rocket (S-20 rocket stage) with a maximum flight altitude of 180 km, a Liftoff Thrust of 36.00 kN, a total mass of 400 kg, a core Diameter of 0.30 m and a total Length of 5.60 m. It was launched 7 times between 1990 and 1996.

Sonda III
Sonda III is a two stage rocket available in three versions, the Sonda III (S30 + S-20 rocket stages), the Sonda III M1 (S30 + S-23 rocket stages) and the Sonda IIIA (S30 + S33 rocket stages). The first two versions rockets have a maximum flight altitude of 600 km, a liftoff Thrust of 102.00 kN, a diameter of 0.30 m and a length of 8.00 m. However Sonda 3 weighs 1500 kg while Sonda 3 M1 weighs 1400 kg at launch. It was launched 27 times between 1976 and 2002.

Sonda IV

Sonda IV is a two stage rocket (S30 + S-43 rocket stages) with a maximum flight altitude of 800 km, a liftoff Thrust of 203.00 kN, a total Mass of 7200 kg, a diameter of 1.01 m and a length of 11.00 m. It was launched 7 times between 1984 and 1990.

References

External links
 The Brazilian Sounding Rocket VSB-30: meeting the Brazilian Space Program and COPUOS objectives
 Sonda rocket family

Sounding rockets of Brazil
Rockets and missiles
Space program of Brazil